Ó, ó (o-acute) is a letter in the  Czech, Emilian-Romagnol, Faroese, Hungarian, Icelandic, Kashubian, Polish, Slovak, and Sorbian languages. This letter also appears in the Afrikaans, Catalan, Dutch, Irish, Nynorsk, Bokmål, Occitan, Portuguese, Spanish, Italian and Galician languages as a variant of letter "o". In some cases, The Letter "ó" is used in some languages as in a high rising tone (e.g. Vietnamese). It is sometimes also used in English for loanwords.

Usage in various languages

Chinese
In Chinese pinyin ó is the yángpíng tone (阳平, high-rising tone) of "o".

Czech and Slovak
Ó is the 24th letter of the Czech alphabet and the 28th letter of the Slovak alphabet. It represents .

Dutch

Emilian-Romagnol 
In Emilian, ó is used to represent [o], e.g. sótt [sotː] "dry". In Romagnol, ó is used to represent  [oː], e.g. alóra [aˈloːra] "then".

Faroese

Hungarian
Ó is the 25th letter of the Hungarian alphabet. It represents the long vowel .

Icelandic
Ó is the 19th letter of the Icelandic alphabet and represents .

Irish
Ó is widely used in Irish where it has various meanings:
 the preposition ó "from"
 the patronymic term Ó "grandson, (usually male) descendant, first or second cousin" (variants: Ua, Uí, Í Uaí). When Irish names were anglicized, the Ó commonly was either dropped or written as O'''.
 the interjection ó "oh"

Italian
In Italian, ó is an optional symbol (especially used in dictionaries) sometimes used to indicate that a stressed o should be pronounced with a close sound: córso , "course", as opposed to còrso , "Corsican" (but both are commonly written with no accent marks when the context is clear). A similar process may occur with é and è, as in *pésca, "fishing", and *pèsca "peach", in which the accent mark is not written (both are written as pesca).

Kashubian
Ó is the 23rd letter of the Kashubian alphabet and represents . It also represents  in southern dialects.

Kazakh

It was proposed in 2018 that Ó should be one of their Latin alphabet to replace Ө and represents  (or ). The proposal was modified to Ö in late 2019.

Polish
Ó is the 21st letter of the Polish alphabet, and represents .

Portuguese
In Portuguese, ó is used to mark a stressed  in words whose stressed syllable is in an unpredictable location within the word, as in "pó" (dust) and "óculos" (glasses). If the location of the stressed syllable is predictable, the acute accent is not used. Ó  contrasts with ô .

Scottish Gaelic
Ó was once widely used in Scottish, but it has now been largely superseded by "ò". It can still be seen in certain writings but is no longer used in standard orthography.

Spanish
Ó is used in the Spanish language to denote an 'o' vowel with abnormal stress.

Sorbian

Vietnamese
In Vietnamese alphabet ó is the sắc tone (high-rising tone) of "o".

Character mappings

 Key strokes 
 Microsoft Windows users can type an "ó" by pressing  on the numeric pad of the keyboard. "Ó" can be typed by pressing 
 In Microsoft Word, pressing , then  will produce the character ó. Pressing , then  will produce the character Ó.  Remember to not press shift before'' apostrophe, as that will not type this character.

See also
Acute accent

References

O-acute
Vowel letters
O-acute